Eunoe pallida is a scale worm known from the Indian Ocean, in the Persian Gulf, Andaman Sea, and off Nias, Sumatra at a depths of 45–614m.

Description
Number of segments 37; elytra 15–16 pairs. No distinct pigmentation pattern. prostomium anterior margin comprising a pair of acute anterior projections. Lateral antennae inserted ventrally (beneath prostomium and median antenna). Notochaetae distinctly thicker than neurochaetae. Bidentate neurochaetae absent.

Commensalism
E. pallida is commensal; its host taxa are sea stars and possibly sea cucumbers.

References

Phyllodocida